Yuma Nagai (永井 祐真, Nagai Yūma, born 18 March 1996) is a Japanese field hockey player. He competed in the 2020 Summer Olympics.

References

External links

1996 births
Living people
Field hockey players at the 2020 Summer Olympics
Japanese male field hockey players
Male field hockey midfielders
Olympic field hockey players of Japan
Sportspeople from Gifu Prefecture
21st-century Japanese people